Brother Leo (died c. 1270) was the favorite disciple, secretary and confessor of St Francis of Assisi. The dates of his birth and of his becoming a Franciscan are not known; a native of Assisi, he was one of the small group of most trusted companions of the saint during his last years.

Life

Although not one of the original twelve companions of St Francis, Leo was one of the first to join him after the approbation of the first Rule of the Friars Minor (1209-1210) and perhaps was already a priest. In the course of time he became the confessor and secretary of the saint, and from about 1220 up to the time of Francis's death Leo was his constant companion. He was with the "Poverello" when the latter retired to Fonte Colombo near Rieti in 1223 to re-write the rule of the order and he accompanied him on his subsequent journey to Rome to seek its approval. The year following Leo was with the saint on Mount La Verna when Francis received the stigmata. Francis called him "Frate Pecorello di Dio" because of Leo's simplicity and tenderness. Leo nursed his master during his last illness.

Leo had entered deeply into the bitter disappointments experienced by the saint during the last few years of his life, and soon after Francis's death he came into conflict with those whom he considered traitors to the Poverello and his ideal of poverty. After Francis's death Leo took a leading part in the opposition to Elias of Cortona. Having protested against the collection of money for the erection of the Basilica of San Francesco, it was Leo who broke in pieces the marble box which Elias had set up for offertories for the completion of the basilica at Assisi. For this Elias had him scourged, and this outrage on St Francis's dearest disciple consolidated the opposition to Elias. Leo was the leader in the early stages of the struggle in the order for the maintenance of St Francis's ideas on strict poverty.

He thereupon retired to some hermitage of the order. Leo assisted at Saint Clara's deathbed, 1253; after suffering many persecutions from the dominant party in the order he died at the Porziuncola in extreme old age, and his remains are buried in the Basilica of St. Francis.

Much that is known concerning him is collected by Paul Sabatier in the "Introduction" to the Speculum perfectionis (The Mirror of Perfection). It was likely compiled after his death based on stories that he told and on his writings.

Brother Leo in Literature 
Brother Leo figures prominently in Nikos Kazantzakis' book Saint Francis, or God's Little Pauper. In this book, Leo is portrayed as Francis' constant companion. Leo is utterly faithful and steadfast, and yet struggles with his own shortcomings while following Francis.

References 

1270 deaths
Italian Franciscans
Year of birth unknown